Michael Sollis (born 1985 in Canberra, Australia) is an Australian composer and musician based in Canberra, Australia.  Sollis is director of The Griffyn Ensemble  and a noted collaborator, working with artists such as Jyll Bradley and scientist Fred Watson, and commissioned by groups such as the Australian Society of Music Educators.
  
Sollis has published research analyzing the interplay between language and music, and has been influenced by the music and culture of Papua New Guinea. Sollis studied with, and later taught alongside, Jim Cotter and Dr Larry Sitsky at the ANU School of Music

Festival Director Robyn Archer featured Sollis’ work in the Centenary of Canberra. Sollis has also been influenced by his participation in the semi-professional Canberra Raiders Cup, playing First Grade for Rugby League club the Gungahlin Bulls from the age of 16.  In 2015 he developed The Dirty Red Digger, combining the stories of young Rugby League players with new music.

In 2016 Sollis was appointed as the inaugural Artistic Director for Musica Viva Australia, Education, Australia's largest music education program.

External links
Michael Sollis website
Associate Artist, Australian Music Centre
The Griffyn Ensemble

References

1985 births
Australian classical composers
Australian male classical composers
Australian National University alumni
Living people
People from Canberra